Cathie is both a feminine given name and a surname. Notable people with the name include:

Given name:
Cathie Adams (born 1950), American politician
Cathie Beck (born 1955), American journalist and writer
Cathie Black (born 1944), American educator
Cathie Craigie (born 1954), Scottish politician
Cathie Felstead (born 1954), English illustrator
Cathie Jung, world record holder
Cathie Linz, American writer
Cathie Pelletier (born 1953), American writer
Cathie Ryan, American singer
Cathie Schweitzer, American women's basketball coach
Cathie Taylor (born 1944), Canadian-born American actress and singer
Cathie Wright (1929–2012), American politician

Surname:
Bruce Cathie (1930–2013), New Zealand aviator and writer
George Cathie (footballer, born 1876), Australian rules footballer
George Cathie (footballer, born 1905), Australian rules footballer
Ian Cathie (born 1932), Australian politician
Poppy Cooksey (born 1940), British fencer, previously Janet Clouston Bewley Cathie

See also
Lake Cathie, New South Wales
Kathie
Kathy
Cathy
Kathi

Feminine given names